Nepton is an unincorporated community in Fleming County, Kentucky, United States, at . Its area code is 606 and its ZIP code is 41093.

External links 
 http://us.cqww.net/city_info.php/cityid/15136
 http://www.nepton.de

Unincorporated communities in Fleming County, Kentucky
Unincorporated communities in Kentucky